M1899 may refer to:

 M1899 carbine variant of the Springfield Model 1892–99
 M1899 carbine variant of the Krag–Jørgensen
 FN Browning M1899 variant of the FN M1900
 M1899 variant of the Mauser C96